Monte Marenzo is a comune (municipality) in the Province of Lecco in the Italian region Lombardy, located about  northeast of Milan and about  southeast of Lecco.  
Monte Marenzo borders the following municipalities: Brivio, Calolziocorte, Cisano Bergamasco, Torre de' Busi.

References

External links
 Official website

Cities and towns in Lombardy